Roque de Garachico is a small island or roque located  off the north coast of the island of Tenerife (Canary Islands, Spain) belonging to the municipality of Garachico. The area was protected in 1987.

References 
Gobierno de Canarias (2009) - Normas de Conservación del Monumento Natural del Roque de Garachico
Canarian government

Tenerife
Rock formations of Spain
Volcanic plugs of the Canary Islands
Pliocene volcanoes